Lazor Wulf is an American adult-animated television series produced by Williams Street for Adult Swim that premiered on April 8, 2019. Originating as a webcomic on Tumblr in 2013, it is directed by creator Henry Bonsu, with Daniel Weidenfeld who serves as co-developer. The first season was animated by Bento Box Entertainment and the second season was animated by 6 Point Harness.

On November 7, 2019, Adult Swim announced that the show has been renewed for a second season, which had a stealth premiere on April 1, 2020 and officially premiered on December 7, 2020.

In June 2021, writer Judnick Mayard announced that Adult Swim cancelled the series after two seasons.

Synopsis
Lazor Wulf follows a wolf who carries a laser on his back and the adventures he and his pack of carefree friends face while hanging out at their neighborhood joints like The Clurb and Esther's.

Cast
 Vince Staples as Lazor Wulf
 J.D. Witherspoon as Stupid Horse, Various
 Ettore "Big E" Ewen as Canon Wulf
 Andre Pascoe as King Yeti
 Reginald VelJohnson as God
 Quinta Brunson as Blazor Wulf, The Youth
 D.R.A.M. as Wallace
 Henry Bonsu as Various

Episodes

Pilot (2016)

Season 1 (2019)

Season 2 (2020–21)

References

Notes

External links

2019 American television series debuts
2021 American television series endings
2010s American adult animated television series
2020s American adult animated television series
2010s American black cartoons
2020s American black cartoons
American adult animated comedy television series
American flash adult animated television series
English-language television shows
Adult Swim original programming
Television series by Williams Street
Television series about wolves